Georgios Angonas is a Greek Cypriot male artistic gymnast, representing his nation in international competitions.

Career
Angonas was part of the Cypriot team that won bronze in the team competition at the 2022 Commonwealth Games in Birmingham.

External links

References

2003 births
Living people
Cypriot male artistic gymnasts
Commonwealth Games medallists in gymnastics
Gymnasts at the 2022 Commonwealth Games
Commonwealth Games bronze medallists for Cyprus
Medallists at the 2022 Commonwealth Games